The 2006–07 Austrian Cup was the 73rd season of Austria's nationwide football cup competition. It started on July 28, 2006 with the first game of the Preliminary Round. The final was held at the Gerhard Hanappi Stadium, Vienna on 1 May 2007.

The teams representing Austria in European competitions (Austria Wien, Red Bull Salzburg, FC Pasching and SV Mattersburg) received a bye to the third round of the tournament.

The competition was won by Austria Vienna after beating SV Mattersburg 2–1. It was the 26th Austrian Cup title for the team from Vienna and the third in a row. Austria Vienna also qualified for the second qualifying round of the 2007–08 UEFA Cup in the process.

Preliminary round
The Preliminary Round involved 60 amateur clubs from all regional federations, divided into smaller groups according to the Austrian federal states. Thirty games were played between July 28 and August 15, 2006, with the winners advancing to the First Round.

|-
|colspan="3" style="background-color:#fcc;"|

|-
|colspan="3" style="background-color:#fcc;"|

|-
|colspan="3" style="background-color:#fcc;"|

|-
|colspan="3" style="background-color:#fcc;"|

|-
|colspan="3" style="background-color:#fcc;"|

|-
|colspan="3" style="background-color:#fcc;"|

|-
|colspan="3" style="background-color:#fcc;"|

|-
|colspan="3" style="background-color:#fcc;"|

|-
|colspan="3" style="background-color:#fcc;"|

|-
|colspan="3" style="background-color:#fcc;"|

|}

First round
The first round games were played on September 12 – 13, 2006.

|-
|colspan="3" style="background-color:#fcc;"|

|-
|colspan="3" style="background-color:#fcc;"|

|}

Matches

Second round
The second round games were played on October 17 – 24, 2006.

|-
|colspan="3" style="background-color:#fcc;"|

|-
|colspan="3" style="background-color:#fcc;"|

|-
|colspan="3" style="background-color:#fcc;"|

|}

Matches

Third round
The third round games were played on November 14 – 21, 2006.

|-
|colspan="3" style="background-color:#fcc;"|

|-
|colspan="3" style="background-color:#fcc;"|

|-
|colspan="3" style="background-color:#fcc;"|

|}

Matches

Quarter-finals
The games were played on March 13, 2007.

|-
|colspan="3" style="background-color:#fcc;"|

|}

Matches

Semi-finals
The games were played on 3 and 4 April 2007.

|-
|colspan="3" style="background-color:#fcc;"|

|-
|colspan="3" style="background-color:#fcc;"|

|}

Results

Final

Details

References

External links
 RSSSF page
 Austriasoccer.at page

Austrian Cup seasons
Cup
Austrian Cup, 2006-07